William E. Baldwin (born March 6, 1948) is a former Democratic member of the Pennsylvania House of Representatives.
He was elected to Court of Common Pleas of Schuylkill County on November 3, 1987.

References

Democratic Party members of the Pennsylvania House of Representatives
Living people
1948 births
Judges of the Pennsylvania Courts of Common Pleas